Roy John Romanow  (born August 12, 1939) is a Canadian politician and the 12th premier of Saskatchewan from 1991 to 2001.

Early life
Romanow was born in Saskatoon, Saskatchewan, to Tekla and Michael Romanow, who were Ukrainian immigrants from Ordiv, currently Chervonohrad Raion, Ukraine. His first language as a child was Ukrainian.

He studied at the University of Saskatchewan, earning a B.A. in Political Science and a LL.B. while involving himself heavily and early on in student politics.

Political career

Electoral record
Romanow had considerable electoral success, being elected to the Legislative Assembly of Saskatchewan eight times in the nine general elections from 1967 to 1999, as a member of the Saskatchewan New Democratic Party.

He was first elected to the Legislative Assembly of Saskatchewan in the 1967 provincial election in the riding of Saskatoon Riversdale.  He was re-elected in the general elections of 1971, 1975 and 1978.  In the 1982 general election he was defeated by Jo-Ann Zazelenchuk, a 22-year-old retail employee, but easily defeated Zazelenchuk in a 1986 rematch, taking over 68 percent of the vote.  He was re-elected in the general elections of 1991, 1995 and 1999.  He resigned his seat in 2001.

Member of the Blakeney government
Romanow served in the cabinet of Premier Allan Blakeney from 1971 to 1982.  At various times, Romanow served as deputy premier and Attorney General for Saskatchewan.

During the 1981 discussions over patriation of the Canadian constitution, the federal Minister of Justice, Jean Chrétien, the Ontario Attorney General, Roy McMurtry, and Romanow worked out the final details of Canada's new constitutional provisions, resulting in the famous late-night Kitchen Accord. Romanow objected strongly to any protections on private property in the new Canadian Charter of Rights and Freedoms, and none were included.

Premier of Saskatchewan
On November 7, 1987, Romanow replaced Allan Blakeney as leader of the Saskatchewan New Democratic Party and Leader of the Official Opposition. When the NDP won a majority of seats in the 1991 provincial election, he became Premier of Saskatchewan.

Romanow's government was more conservative than previous NDP administrations, and was considered a practitioner of Third Way policies.  Romanow, who inherited a $14 billion debt from the previous Conservative government, eliminated the annual budgetary deficit by closing rural hospitals, cutting services and raising taxes. Romanow's government also had the benefit of substantially lower interest rates at a national level than did his predecessor in the 1980s. The Romanow NDP explained the cutbacks to the left wing of the party by claiming Romanow's range of political action was limited by the large debt accumulated by previous governments.

In the 1999 provincial election, the NDP was re-elected to a third consecutive term, but was reduced to a minority of seats in the legislature. Romanow along with Dwain Lingenfelter negotiated an agreement to form a coalition government with the Saskatchewan Liberal Party, appointing several Liberals to Cabinet. Romanow retired in 2001, and was replaced as leader of the NDP and Premier by Lorne Calvert.

Life after politics

Refusal to enter federal politics
Romanow was well-acquainted with Pierre Trudeau, Liberal Prime Minister from 1968–1979 and 1980–1984. He remains a close friend of Jean Chrétien, who was a Liberal prime minister from 1993 to 2003.

The federal Liberals, and especially Jean Chrétien, had long tried to encourage Romanow to run federally as a Liberal, but he always refused.

Federal Royal commission on the future of health care in Canada
On April 4, 2001, Romanow was appointed to head the Royal Commission on the Future of Health Care in Canada by Governor General Adrienne Clarkson, on the advice of Prime Minister Jean Chrétien.  He released the Romanow Report in 2002, which outlined suggestions to improve the health care system.

Honours
On November 13, 2003 he was sworn in as a member of the Queen's Privy Council for Canada by Governor General Clarkson, again on the advice of Prime Minister Chrétien.

In 2003, he was made an Officer of the Order of Canada and was awarded the Saskatchewan Order of Merit. Romanow's official portrait was unveiled at Saskatchewan's Legislative Assembly in 2005, when he received the Commemorative Medal for the Centennial of Saskatchewan from Lieutenant Governor Lynda Haverstock.

Academic positions
 He served as the Chancellor of the University of Saskatchewan from 2016 to 2019.
 He is a senior policy fellow in the College of Arts and Science at the University of Saskatchewan.

References

External links
Article on Saskatchewan Order of Merit Appointment 

1939 births
Attorneys-General of Saskatchewan
Canadian people of Ukrainian descent
Canadian King's Counsel
Lawyers in Saskatchewan
Leaders of the Saskatchewan CCF/NDP
Living people
Members of the King's Privy Council for Canada
Officers of the Order of Canada
Politicians from Saskatoon
Premiers of Saskatchewan
Saskatchewan New Democratic Party MLAs
University of Saskatchewan alumni
University of Saskatchewan College of Law alumni
20th-century Canadian politicians
21st-century Canadian politicians
Members of the Executive Council of Saskatchewan